Eric Prydz Presents Pryda (also known simply as Pryda) is a retrospective compilation album by Swedish DJ Eric Prydz. The album is a compilation of all of Prydz' work under the alias "Pryda", mostly previously released on singles through Pryda Recordings. It was released on 21 May 2012 through Virgin Records on digital download format, and a 3-disc CD box set was also released by Virgin, on 22 May 2012.

Overview
Pryda is Prydz' first full-length album following his career of releasing music in single and EP format. All of the tracks on the two retrospective mixes were previously released as singles on Pryda Recordings, as well as "Pjanoo" on the first disc. Prydz states in the CD booklet: "This album is a reflection of the last 8 years of my life, I'm so pleased to finally be able to present this to you."

Track listing
The Beatport edition of the album only includes the first disc of the CD box set, with "You (Interlude)" and "Pjanoo" excluded, and "SW4" replaced with "SW4 (Club Mix)". This edition is entirely unmixed for use in DJ sets. The three disc CD version was also released on digital download.

Digital download – Beatport edition

CD and digital download

Charts

Release history

References

2012 compilation albums
Eric Prydz albums
Virgin Records compilation albums